Sieg Howdy! is the second album by Jello Biafra and The Melvins.  It consists of songs recorded during the same sessions that produced their first collaboration Never Breathe What You Can't See but not used on that album, plus remixes of four songs from the first album.

The opening track, a cover of the Alice Cooper classic "Halo of Flies", has special significance for Biafra and The Melvins, as Biafra had heard The Melvins cover it when he first witnessed the group perform live.

Also featured on the album is an updated version of "California über alles" with new lyrics by Biafra about the recall campaign that placed Arnold Schwarzenegger in the California governor's office, as well as "Those Dumb Punk Kids (Will Buy Anything)", a song where Biafra openly criticizes his former Dead Kennedys bandmates.

The remix of "Enchanted Thoughtfist" is the first time Biafra and his fellow co-conspirator in Lard, Al Jourgensen of Ministry, have collaborated on a recording since the sessions for Pure Chewing Satisfaction and 70's Rock Must Die.

Track listing

In the track listing on the back of the CD and booklet it lists "Kali-Fornia über alles 21st Century (Live)" as 5, "Wholly Buy-Bull" as 6, and "Voted Off the Island" as 7.

Personnel
J Lo – lead vocals
Kim Jong Buzzo – guitar, backing vocals
Kevin Rutmaninoff – bass (1–6, 8–10)
Dale E. Sitty – drums, backing vocals
with
Adam Jones – guitar (3, 7–10)
Dave "The Incredible Hulk" Stone – bass (7), backing vocals
Mike Scaccia – additional guitar (9)

Additional personnel
Marshall Lawless – backing vocals, producer
Ali G. North – backing vocals, producer
Jesse Luscious – backing vocals
Lady Monster – backing vocals
Tom 5 – backing vocals
Adrienne Droogas – backing vocals
John the Baker – backing vocals
Loto Ball – backing vocals
Wendy-O-Matic – backing vocals
Johnny NoMoniker – backing vocals
Toshi Kasai – engineer
Matt Kelley – engineer
Andy Gregg – live sound and recording on track 7 (Seattle, WA: 12/30/04)
Shawn Simmons – live sound and recording on track 7 (Seattle, WA: 12/30/04)
Jack Endino – mixing on track 7
Al Jourgensen – remixing on track 9
Marco A. Ramirez – engineer on track 9
Dälek – Remixing on track 8
Deaf Nephews (Dale Crover & Toshi Kasai) – remixing on track 10
Camille Rose Garcia – illustrations
Mackie Osborne – design

References

2005 albums
Alternative Tentacles albums
Jello Biafra albums
Melvins albums
Collaborative albums